A ranch hand is a manual laborer on a ranch, such as a cowboy.

Ranch Hand may also refer to:
Operation Ranch Hand, a US Air Force operation during the Vietnam war
Ranch Hand Truck Accessories, an American manufacturer of heavy duty truck accessories
Rossi Ranch Hand, a Mare's Leg-style handgun